Cherryland may refer to:

 Cherryland, California
 Traverse City, Michigan
 Višnjica, Serbia, Belgrade